Fothergilla major, the large witch alder or mountain witch alder, is a species of flowering plant in the genus Fothergilla, family Hamamelidaceae, that is native to woodland and swamps in the Allegheny Mountains and southern Appalachian Mountains of the southeastern United States. The leaves often turn brilliant shades of red and orange in autumn.

Fothergilla major prefers full sun to part shade and is disease and insect resistant. It thrives in moist, acidic soils, but is fairly drought tolerant. It is hardy in USDA hardiness zones 4–8.

This plant is named for the English physician and plant collector John Fothergill (1712-1780). The Latin specific epithet major means "larger". It has gained the Royal Horticultural Society's Award of Garden Merit.

References

External links

Hamamelidaceae